Francesco Simonazzi (born 8 March 2004) is an Italian racing driver who is currently racing in the Euroformula Open Championship with BVM Racing. He previously competed in the Italian F4 Championship with the same outfit.

Career

Lower formulae

2019 
In 2019, Simonazzi made his car racing debut, competing in the Italian F4 Championship with Cram Motorsport. He experienced a challenging rookie year, scoring points on just one occasion, with an eighth place coming at Imola. The Italian missed the final two rounds of the season, which meant that he ended up 22nd in the standings.

2020 
Simonazzi returned to Italian F4 for 2020, contesting the first round for DRZ Benelli. Having scored two points in a pair of appearances for Jenzer Motorsport, which also included a one-off start in Spanish F4, where he took the first podium of his career, Simonazzi drove for BVM Racing in the remaining half of the Italian F4 campaign. More points finishes followed, as the Italian finished 18th in the championship with a best result of sixth at the season finale at Vallelunga.

2021 

The following year, Simonazzi once again raced in the Italian F4 Championship. He remained with BVM and scored 28 points, having competed in merely four of the seven rounds, which left him 14th at season's end.

He also made an appearance in the F2000 Italian Formula Trophy during 2021, scoring his first two victories in car racing.

Euroformula Open

2021 
In 2021, Simonazzi spearheaded BVM's return to the Euroformula Open Championship, racing in the final two rounds at Monza and Barcelona. With the former event yielding a triple of points finishes, Simonazzi was classified 18th in the standings.

2022 
He returned to the series for the 2022 season, being the sole driver for BVM Racing once more. Despite low grid numbers, the Italian struggled in the opening rounds, having to wait until the middle of the season for his first podium, which he scored at the Hungaroring. The biggest success of his season would follow just two rounds later, as, after finishing second in Race 2, Simonazzi scored his first win in the category at the Red Bull Ring, inheriting victory after original race winner Vladislav Lomko was awarded a five-second penalty for colliding with Frederick Lubin. A less successful weekend in Monza followed, which included Simonazzi causing a collision with Christian Mansell, which sent the Australian's car flipping upside down, before Simonazzi capped off his season by taking second place in Race 1 at Barcelona. This result meant that the Italian finished sixth in the standings, being the second-lowest full-time competitor in the standings, only ahead of Alex García.

2023 
Simonazzi returned to the Euroformula Open in 2023, remaining with BVM Racing once more.

Karting record

Karting career summary

Racing record

Racing career summary 

† As Simonazzi was a guest driver, he was ineligible for points.
* Season still in progress.

Complete Italian F4 Championship results 
(key) (Races in bold indicate pole position) (Races in italics indicate fastest lap)

Complete Euroformula Open Championship results 
(key) (Races in bold indicate pole position; races in italics indicate points for the fastest lap of top ten finishers)

References

External links 
 

Living people
2004 births
Italian racing drivers
Euroformula Open Championship drivers
Spanish F4 Championship drivers
Italian F4 Championship drivers
BVM Racing drivers
Jenzer Motorsport drivers
Cram Competition drivers
Sportspeople from Reggio Emilia